Elections to Liverpool City Council were held on 6 May 2010.  One third of the council was up for election. (30 seats)

As Liverpool Council is elected in thirds, councillors elected in the 2006 elections defend their seats this year, and the vote share changes are compared on that basis.

After  the election, the composition of the council was:

Election result

Ward results
Changes in vote share are compared with the corresponding elections in 2006.

* - Retiring Councillor

Allerton and Hunts Cross

Anfield

Belle Vale

Central

Childwall

Church

Clubmoor

County

Cressington

Croxteth

Everton

Fazakerley

Greenbank

Kensington & Fairfield

Kirkdale

Knotty Ash

Mossley Hill

Norris Green

Old Swan

Picton

Princes Park

Riverside

St. Michael's

Speke-Garston

Tuebrook & Stoneycroft

Warbreck

Wavertree

West Derby

Woolton

Yew Tree

By-elections

Croxteth, 18 November 2010

Following the death of Cllr Rose Bailey  and the resignation of Cllr Phil Moffat a dual by-election was held on 18 November 2010. Two candidates were returned:

References 

2010
2010 English local elections
May 2010 events in the United Kingdom
2010s in Liverpool